The British American Drama Academy is a drama school in London, in the United Kingdom. It is affiliated with Sarah Lawrence College and Yale University.

Background
The British American Drama Academy (BADA) was founded in 1983 by Tony Branch and Carolyn Sands based upon an idea they developed whilst living in La Jolla, California in 1982. Its goal is to enable students from around the world to study classical theatre with leading actors and directors of the British theatre.

The BADA's aim was also to bring the best British directors and teachers together with young actors of great promise in North America and from elsewhere. Working initially from his apartment in La Jolla, Anthony enlisted volunteers (including James Pearson, Robert Zimmerman, and many others) to help organize the first class for the first summer program, which was planned to be in Santa Fe, New Mexico. 

The program moved in 1985 to Regents Park, London, in order to be better connected with the British theatreworld. Since 1988, it has been affiliated with the Sarah Lawrence College, which has spring or fall semesters with BADA in London for credit.

Midsummer in Oxford Programme
Running since 1984, BADA holds a three-week programme known as the 'Midsummer in Oxford' programme, in which participants study, live and work alongside BADA and its associated practitioners in Oxford. The programme is based in Magdalen College in Oxford University. It is run in association with Yale School of Drama.

Notable alumni
Past students have included:

Simone Missick
Michael Arata
Jacinda Barrett
Byrdie Bell
Orlando Bloom
Chadwick Boseman
Jack Davenport
Brandon Victor Dixon
Chiara de Luca
Jennifer Ehle
Melissa Errico
Sam Feuer
Paul Giamatti
Peri Gilpin
Mamie Gummer
Anna Gunn
Noah Harlan
Jamie Kennedy
Yunjin Kim
Tarell Alvin McCraney
T.J. Miller
Elizabeth Mitchell
Ruth Negga
Nicole Oliver
Oliver Platt
Paul Rudd
Marco Sanchez
David Schwimmer
Billy Slaughter
Adam Smoluk
Ryan Jamaal Swain
Nicole Sullivan
Justin Theroux
Tracie Thoms
Nicolas Wright
Bellamy Young

Teachers
Those running masterclasses at BADA have included: Ben Kingsley, Judi Dench, Rosemary Harris, Alan Rickman, Fiona Shaw, Juliet Stevenson, Simon McBurney, John Barton, Brian Cox, Dorothy Tutin, Sir Derek Jacobi, Kelly Hunter, and Jeremy Irons.

References

External links
British American Drama Academy

Theatrical organisations in the United Kingdom
Drama schools in the United Kingdom